Woodfordia is a genus of flowering plant in the family Lythraceae.

Species 
 Woodfordia floribunda (unresolved)
 Woodfordia fruticosa (L.) Kurz (= W. tomentosa)
 Woodfordia uniflora (A. Rich.) Koehne

References

External links
 
 
 The Plant List: Woodfordia

Lythraceae
Lythraceae genera